The 2013 Reinert Open was a professional tennis tournament played on outdoor clay courts. It was the sixth edition of the tournament which was part of the 2013 ITF Women's Circuit, offering a total of $50,000 in prize money. It took place in Versmold, Germany, on 1–7 July 2013.

WTA entrants

Seeds 

 1 Rankings as of 24 June 2013

Other entrants 
The following players received wildcards into the singles main draw:
  Vivian Heisen
  Antonia Lottner
  Anna Tatishvili
  Julia Wachaczyk

The following players received entry from the qualifying draw:
  Varvara Flink
  Franziska König
  Tamara Korpatsch
  Yana Morderger

Champions

Women's singles 

  Dinah Pfizenmaier def.  Maryna Zanevska 6–4, 4–6, 6–4

Women's doubles 

  Sofia Shapatava /  Anna Tatishvili def.  Claire Feuerstein /  Renata Voráčová 6–4, 6–4

External links 
 Official website 
 2013 Reinert Open at ITFtennis.com

2013 ITF Women's Circuit
Reinert Open
2013 in German tennis
2013 in German women's sport